Kazimierz Jerzy Skrzypna-Twardowski (20 October 1866 – 11 February 1938) was a Polish philosopher, psychologist, logician, and rector of the Lwów University. He was initially affiliated with Alexius Meinong's Graz School of object theory.

Life
Twardowski's family belonged to the Ogończyk coat of arms.

Twardowski studied philosophy at the University of Vienna with Franz Brentano and Robert von Zimmermann. In 1891 he received his doctorate with his dissertation, Idee und Perzeption (Idea and Perception), and in 1894 he presented his habilitation thesis Zur Lehre vom Inhalt und Gegenstand der Vorstellungen (On the Doctrine of the Content and Object of Presentations) at Vienna. He originated many novel ideas related to metaphilosophy.

He lectured at the University of Vienna in the years 1894–95.

In 1895 was appointed professor at Lwów (Lemberg in Austrian Galicia, now Lviv in the Ukraine). An outstanding lecturer, he was also a rector of the Lwów University during  World War I. There Twardowski soon established the Lwów–Warsaw school of logic and became the "father of Polish logic". Among his students were the logicians Stanisław Leśniewski, Jan Łukasiewicz and Tadeusz Czeżowski, the psychologist Władysław Witwicki, the historian of philosophy Władysław Tatarkiewicz, the phenomenologist and aesthetician Roman Ingarden, as well as philosophers close to the Vienna Circle such as Tadeusz Kotarbiński and Kazimierz Ajdukiewicz.

Twardowski also established the Polish Philosophical Society in 1904, the first laboratory of experimental psychology in Poland in 1907, and the journal  in 1911.

He officially retired in 1930.

Work
In his 1894 book On the Content and Object of Presentations (also known as On the Doctrine of the Content and Object of Presentations), Twardowski argues for a distinction between content and object in the frame of the theory of intentionality of his teacher Franz Brentano. According to him the mind is divided in two main areas: acts or mental phenomena, and a physical phenomenon. For example, an act of presentation is aimed at a presentation. This is what he called ‘intentionality’, aboutness. Every act is about something, but also every presentation goes together with an act of presentation.

This theory suffers from the problem that it is not clear what the presentation exactly is. Is the presentation something only in the mind, or is it also in the world as object? Twardowski says that sometimes presentation is used for the object in the world and sometimes for the immanent content of a mental phenomenon.

Twardowski offers a solution for this problem and proposes to make a distinction between the content of a presentation and the object of a presentation.

In his book Twardowski offers an analogy to clarify this distinction. He uses the example of a painting. People say of a landscape that it is painted, but also of a painting that it is painted. In the first case the word ‘painting’ is used in a modifying way (a painted landscape is not a landscape at all), while in the latter case the word painting is used in a qualitative or attributive way. Twardowski argues that presentations are similar. The content is the painted painting and the object is the painted landscape. The content resembles the present ‘picture’ in one's mind, and the object the landscape.

Bibliography

Works in German and Polish
 Über den Unterschied zwischen der klaren und deutlichen Perception und der klaren und deutlichen Idee bei Descartes (On the difference between clear and distinct perception and between clear and distinct ideas in Descartes, doctoral dissertation, 1891)
 Idee und perzeption. Eine erkenntnis-theoretische Untersuchung aus Descartes (1892)
 Zur Lehre vom Inhalt und Gegenstand der Vorstellungen (On the Doctrine of the Content and Object of Presentations, habilitation thesis, 1894) 
 Wyobrażenie i pojęcie (1898)
 O tzw. prawdach względnych (1900)
 Über sogenannte relative Wahrheiten (1902)
 Über begriffliche Vorstellungen (1903)
 Das Wesen der Begriffe allegato a Jahresbericht der Wiener philosophischen Gesellschaft (1903)
 O psychologii, jej przedmiocie, zadaniach, metodzie, stosunku do innych nauk i jej rozwoju (1913)
 Rozprawy i artykuły filozoficzne (1927)
 Wybrane pisma filozoficzne (1965) (Collection of the philosophical essays)
 Wybór pism psychologicznych i pedagogicznych (1992) (Collection of the psychological and pedagogical essays)
 Dzienniki (1997)

Translations
 On the Content and Object of Presentations. A Psychological Investigation. The Hague: Martinus Nijhoff 1977. Translated and with an introduction by Reinhardt Grossmann.
 On Actions, Products and Other Topics in Philosophy. Edited by Johannes Brandl and Jan Wolenski. Amsterdam: Rodopi 1999. Translated and annotated by Arthur Szylewicz.
 On Prejudices, Judgments and Other Topics in Philosophy. Edited by Anna Brożek e Jacek Jadacki. Amsterdam: Rodopi 2014. 
 Sur les objets intentionnels (1893–1901). Paris: Vrin 1993. French translation of Zur Lehre vom Inhalt und Gegenstand der Vorstellungen and other texts by Edmund Husserl.

See also
 Representationalism	
 Logology (science of science)
 Polish logic
 History of philosophy in Poland
 List of Poles

Notes

References
 Jens Cavallin, Content and Object: Husserl, Twardowski and Psychologism, Springer, 1997.
 Sandra Lapointe, Jan Wolenski, Mathieu Marion, Wioletta Miskiewicz (eds.), The Golden Age of Polish philosophy. Kazimierz Twardowski's philosophical legacy, Springer, 2009.
 
 
 Maria van der Schaar, Kazimierz Twardowski: A Grammar for Philosophy, Brill, 2015.

External links
 
 
 
 Polish Philosophy Page: Kazimierz Twardowski
 Kazimierz Twardowski on the Content and Object of Presentations
 Annotated bibliography of and about Twardowski
 Archives of the Lvov-Varsovie School – Archiwum Kazimierza Twardowskiego Digital library of the works of Twardowski
 Kazimierz Twardowski – philosopher, the founder of the Lvov-Warsaw School

1866 births
1938 deaths
19th-century essayists
19th-century Polish philosophers
19th-century psychologists
20th-century essayists
20th-century Polish non-fiction writers
20th-century Polish philosophers
20th-century psychologists
Abstract object theory
Consciousness researchers and theorists
Epistemologists
History of logic
History of psychology
Lecturers
Members of the Lwów Scientific Society
Metaphilosophers
Metaphysicians
Ontologists
Phenomenologists
Philosophers of logic
Philosophers of mind
Philosophers of psychology
Philosophy academics
Philosophy writers
Polish essayists
Polish logicians
Polish male non-fiction writers
Academic staff of the University of Lviv
University of Lviv rectors
University of Vienna alumni
Academic staff of the University of Vienna
Burials at Lychakiv Cemetery